Datuk Chua Tee Yong (born 19 October 1977) is a Malaysian politician and was the Member of parliament of Malaysia for the Labis constituency in the State of Johor for two terms (2008-2018). He was one of the four Vice-Presidents of the Malaysian Chinese Association (MCA) in the ruling Barisan Nasional (BN) coalition then with the third highest votes for the party election term from 21 December 2013 until 4 November 2018.

Chua was elected to federal Parliament in the 2008 election, succeeding his father Chua Soi Lek in the seat of Labis. In June 2010, he was appointed Deputy Agriculture and Agro-based Industries Minister in a Cabinet reshuffle. The MCA temporarily withdrew from the government post after its poor performance in the 2013 election. Upon its return in 2014, Chua was appointed as Deputy Minister for Finance.
Chua is an accountant and was chief financial officer of a government-linked company.
He served as the Deputy Minister of International Trade and Industry from 2015 to 2018. In the 2018 election he lost and failed to retain his parliamentary seat.

Election results

Honours

 Companion Class II of the Exalted Order of Malacca (D.P.S.M.) - Datuk (2011)

References

Living people
1977 births
People from Johor
People from Batu Pahat
Malaysian politicians of Chinese descent
Chief financial officers
Malaysian Chinese Association politicians
Members of the Dewan Rakyat
21st-century Malaysian politicians
Malaysian people of Teochew descent